Phytophthora rubi is the principal cause of root rot in red raspberry. Originally classified as a variant of P. fragariae some now consider it a distinct species. This organism has been isolated from raspberries in Europe, North America, Chile, and many other countries around the world. It is best controlled through a combination of good management practices and use of resistant varieties. It is a significant cause of crop loss in poor draining soils.

References

External links
Index Fungorum
USDA ARS Fungal Database

rubi
Protists described in 2007
Raspberry diseases